Kåge is a locality situated in Skellefteå Municipality, Västerbotten County, Sweden with 2,248 inhabitants in 2010.

References

External links

Populated places in Västerbotten County
Populated places in Skellefteå Municipality